The Derbi de la Comunitat ("Derby of the Community"), or the Valencian Country Derby, is a regional football rivalry in Spain between La Liga clubs Valencia CF and Villarreal CF.

However, a rivalry began in 1997 when billionaire Fernando Roig failed to succeed his brother Francisco as the owner of Valencia CF and controversially opted instead to buy Villarreal CF from the city of Vila-Real. A relatively unknown team up to that point, Villarreal grew increasingly stronger under Roig's heavy investment, challenging Valencia's supremacy as the biggest club of the region, converting a once non-existent rivalry into the most important game in the autonomous community.

Today the rivalry has evolved into a defining factor as to who is the best team to represent the local area in Spain and worldwide - their meetings include a UEFA Cup semi-final in 2004 and a UEFA Europa League quarter-final in 2019 (both won by Valencia).

Head-to-head statistics
As of 31 December 2022

Source:

All-time results

League

Copa del Rey

Europe

References

Football rivalries in Spain
Valencia CF
Villarreal CF
Football in the Valencian Community
Recurring sporting events established in 1986